The Who Sell Out is the third studio album by the English rock band the Who. It was released on 15 December 1967 by Track Records in the UK and Decca Records in the US.

A concept album, The Who Sell Out is structured as a collection of unrelated songs interspersed with fake commercials and public service announcements, including the second track "Heinz Baked Beans". The album purports to be a broadcast by pirate radio station Radio London. The reference to "selling out" was an intended irony, as the Who had been making real commercials during that period of their career, some of which are included as bonus tracks on the remastered CD.

The album was primarily written by guitarist Pete Townshend, though three tracks were penned by bassist John Entwistle and one by Thunderclap Newman vocalist Speedy Keen, who also sings.  Townshend and Entwistle are joined by vocalist Roger Daltrey and drummer Keith Moon, and organist Al Kooper makes a guest appearance on two tracks.  The album was produced by the band's manager Kit Lambert.

The album's release was reportedly followed by lawsuits due to the mention of real-world commercial interests in the faux commercials and on the album covers, and by the makers of the real jingles (Radio London jingles), who claimed the Who used them without permission. (The jingles were produced by PAMS Productions of Dallas, Texas, which created thousands of station ID jingles in the 1960s and 1970s.) The deodorant company Odorono took offence that Chris Stamp made a request for endorsement dollars. "I Can See for Miles" was released as a single and peaked at number 10 in the UK and number 9 in the US.

The Who Sell Out has received widespread acclaim from critics, some of whom viewed it as the Who's best record. It has also frequently been featured on all-time lists of the best albums, including Rolling Stone magazine's "500 Greatest Albums of All Time". However, it was the band's lowest-charting album on the UK Albums Chart, where it peaked at number 13.

Background
In his book Maximum R & B, Who confidant Richard Barnes claims to have come up with the idea of the band recording commercial jingles after their cover of the Batman theme appeared on the Ready Steady Who EP. Barnes posited the idea to Roger Daltrey, whose similar suggestions to Pete Townshend were allegedly met with derision.

Initially, the band's follow-up to A Quick One was to be titled Who's Lily after their recent single "Pictures of Lily." Early cuts such as a cover of "Summertime Blues," the Coke jingles, and the instrumental "Sodding About," showed the influence of Track Records label-mate Jimi Hendrix on Townshend's guitar playing.

Even before the group had formed, the members of the Who had been profoundly influenced by rock 'n' roll appearing on the radio. The BBC did not broadcast much contemporary music at the time, which was left to stations like Radio Luxembourg and then pirate radio stations such as Radio Caroline, Radio Scotland and Wonderful Radio London. By the end of 1966, the Who had achieved commercial success owing to the mod movement that made up a significant section of the group's early audience. However, the movement was fading, and the TV show Ready, Steady, Go that had boosted the group to fame had been cancelled. The group started touring the US the following year, and started to achieve success with their live act. In summer 1967, the group's managers Kit Lambert and Chris Stamp suggested the band could create a concept album based on pirate radio and structure it in the same manner as that, or a typical US AM radio station. As pirate radio had been influential to mods, it was felt particularly appropriate to pay tribute to it. As well as the music, the inter-song announcements and jingles were a key component of radio, so it was decided to include a selection of humorous asides on the album. The Marine Broadcasting Offences Act came into effect at midnight on 14 August 1967, outlawing all pirate stations (except for Radio Caroline (North And South)) and strengthening the album's effect as a tribute. The aspect separated the Who from their contemporaries in the developing underground rock scene, both musically and stylistically.

Writing and recording 
The first song to be written specifically for the concept was "Jaguar", paying tribute to the car, which was quickly followed by an instrumental the group had recorded for Coca-Cola. "Armenia City in the Sky" was written by a friend of the band, John "Speedy" Keen. According to music critic Richie Unterberger, The Who Sell Out featured "jubilant" psychedelic pop music that veers between "melodic mod pop and powerful instrumentation", while Edna Gundersen from USA Today said the album's style was power pop.

Having finished touring the US, including an appearance at the Monterey Pop Festival, the group returned to the UK on 16 September 1967 to start recording. They made progress on the album for the next three weeks; the first song to be completed was the single, "I Can See for Miles", released the following month. By October, the group had also completed "Armenia City in the Sky", "Early Morning Cold Taxi" and "Girl's Eyes". "Heinz Baked Beans", "Odorono" and "Top Gear" had been completed mid-month, along with a series of linking adverts and jingles mostly recorded by Entwistle and Moon. "Tattoo", "Odorono" and "Rael" were completed by 20 October,  while most of the remainder of the album was recorded in between live shows at the end of the month. "Sunrise", a solo Townshend piece, was the last to be recorded on 2 November. The album was mixed by Lambert and Damon Lyon-Shaw intermittently throughout November, coming up with a finished master on the 20th.

Packaging
The cover is divided into panels featuring a photograph by David Montgomery of each of the band members, two on the front and two on the back. On the front is Pete Townshend applying Odorono brand deodorant from an oversized stick, and Roger Daltrey sitting in a bathtub full of Heinz baked beans (holding an oversized tin can of the same). Daltrey variously claimed that he had either caught pneumonia, the flu, or "the worst cold that [he had] had in [his] lifetime" after sitting for a prolonged period in the bathtub, as the beans had just come out of the fridge, and were "freezing cold". On the back is Keith Moon applying Medac (an acne ointment) from an oversized tube to an oversized pimple, and John Entwistle in a leopard-skin Tarzan suit, squeezing a blonde model in a leopard-skin bikini with one arm and a teddy bear with the other (an ad for the Charles Atlas exercise course mentioned in one of the album's fake commercials).

Release and reception

The album was released in the UK on 15 December 1967. It reached number 13 in the charts. The original release date of 17 November had been pushed back due to arguments about the running order. It was released almost concurrently in the US, reaching number 48. The concept of the album hampered its commercial performance despite positive reviews, as its irony sat awkwardly with the serious ambitions of the underground music scene, and it was too specific to the mod scene's background for many younger pop fans.

In a contemporary review for Rolling Stone, Jann Wenner called The Who Sell Out "fantastic" and praised its "exquisite" sense of humor and the Who's "consummate" musicianship, which includes "wholly original" instrumentation and cleverly placed electronic sounds. Robert Christgau, writing in Esquire, said the album establishes the band as "the third best not just in Britain but the world", while citing "Tattoo" as the best song Townshend has "ever written, worth the price of the album". He later included the album in his "basic record library" of 1960s albums, published in Christgau's Record Guide: Rock Albums of the Seventies (1981). In a retrospective review for AllMusic, Richie Unterberger said that, "on strictly musical merits, it's a terrific set of songs that ultimately stands as one of the group's greatest achievements." Sociomusicologist Simon Frith referred to it as a "Pop art pop masterpiece".

In 1995, The Who Sell Out was reissued by MCA Records with numerous outtakes and rejected jingles added to the end of the original album. In the liner notes for the reissue, Dave Marsh called it "the greatest rock and roll album of its era" and "the Who's consummate masterpiece, the work that holds together most tightly as concept and realization". Marsh believed the album's essence is "most tightly linked to the glorious pop insanity that psychedelia and its aftermath destroyed forever." Reviewing the reissue in The Village Voice, Christgau called it the Who's "only great album", feeling they had yet to "take their pretensions seriously", with nothing but good songs throughout, including the faux-ads and bonus tracks. It was also deemed the band's best work by Todd Hutlock from Stylus Magazine, while Melody Maker said the record was a masterpiece because of its "glorious celebration of pop as useless commodity and a commercially corrupted art form" without degrading itself. Rolling Stone called it "the most successful concept album ever" in a 1999 review.

According to Acclaimed Music, The Who Sell Out is the 333rd most ranked record on critics' all-time lists. In 2003, it was placed at number 113 on Rolling Stones list of the 500 greatest albums of all time, 115 in a 2012 revised list, and 316 on the 2020 list. Mark Kemp, writing in The Rolling Stone Album Guide (2004), called it Townshend's first and best concept album and said that he "successfully does what he would overdo" in Tommy and Quadrophenia: "There's no fixed narrative to take away from the music. And the music is sensational". In 2007, Rolling Stone included it on their list of the 40 essential albums of 1967 and stated, "the Who's finest album exemplifies how pop this famously psychedelic year was." The album was reissued in 2009 as a two-disc deluxe edition, which Danny Kelly of Uncut magazine said was the "definitive" release of the Who's most "entertaining" and "endearing" album. In his review for eMusic, Lenny Kaye said that The Who Sell Out is a "classic of prophetic pop art" because of "the concept of branding that has taken the place of record label patronage these days".

On April 23, 2021, The album was re-released as a new Super Deluxe Edition Set, featuring 112 tracks on 5 CDs: "The Original Mono Album," "The Original Stereo Album," a Disc of "Pete Townshend's Demos," a Disc of "The Who's Studio Sessions," a Disc called "The Road To Tommy," 48 tracks previously unreleased, two 7" Singles, posters, memorabilia, and new liner notes from Pete Townshend.

Track listing

Original release
All songs written by Pete Townshend, except where noted.

Track 1 titled "I Can't Reach You" on various reissues
Track 2 titled "Spotted Henry" on original US LPs

2009 deluxe edition 
This edition contains the original album in stereo on disc one, the mono mix on disc two, and bonus tracks on both discs.

Personnel
Adapted from the liner notes of the 1995 reissue.

The Who
Roger Daltrey – lead and backing vocals
Pete Townshend – acoustic and electric guitars, backing vocals, lead vocals ("Odorono", "Our Love Was", "I Can't Reach You", "Sunrise", "Rael Naive", "Jaguar", "Glittering Girl"), piano
John Entwistle – bass guitar, horns ("Armenia City in the Sky", "Someone's Coming", "Top Gear", "Heinz Baked Beans", "In the Hall of the Mountain King"), backing vocals, lead vocals ("Medac", "Silas Stingy", "Summertime Blues", "John Mason Cars", "Jaguar") 
Keith Moon – drums, lead vocals ("Girl's Eyes", "John Mason Cars")

Additional musicians
Al Kooper – organ ("Rael 1", "Mary Anne with the Shaky Hand (electric version)")
Speedy Keen – co-lead vocals ("Armenia City in the Sky")
Personnel
 Kit Lambert – producer, engineer
 Damon Lyon-Shaw – engineer
 Jon Astley and Andy Macpherson – engineers (1995 remaster)
 David Montgomery – cover photography
 David King and Roger Law – sleeve design
 Adrian George – psychedelic poster design
 Richard Evans – 1995 and 2009 reissues, 2021 Super Deluxe Edition design and art direction

Charts

Certifications

See also
Album era
FM!, a 2018 album by Vince Staples also using broadcast radio as a conceptual framework
Petra Haden Sings: The Who Sell Out

References
Footnotes

Citations

Bibliography

Further reading

External links

The Who Sell Out (1995 reissue) (Adobe Flash) at Radio3Net (streamed copy where licensed)
 
Lyrics from thewho.net, a fansite with forum
The Who Sell Out liner notes – Song-by-song liner notes for the album from thewho.net
Guitar tablature from thewho.net

The Who albums
Albums produced by Kit Lambert
Concept albums
Pirate radio
Track Records albums
1967 albums
Albums recorded at Gold Star Studios
Art pop albums
Power pop albums by English artists
Psychedelic pop albums
Albums recorded at IBC Studios
Works about consumerism
Works about radio